Temburu is a village located in Pathapatnam mandal in Srikakulam district.

Temburu railway station is located on Naupada-Gunupur branch line.

References

Villages in Srikakulam district